Princeton Municipal Airport  is a city-owned public-use airport located one nautical mile (1.85 km) southwest of the central business district of Princeton, a city in Mille Lacs County, Minnesota, United States. This airport is included in the FAA's National Plan of Integrated Airport Systems 2015–2019, which categorizes it as a general aviation airport.

Although most U.S. airports use the same three-letter location identifier for the FAA and IATA, this airport is assigned PNM by the FAA but has no designation from the IATA.

History 
The Federal Aviation Administration relocated the flight service station (FSS) for Minnesota to Princeton in 1987. The airport was completely renovated in 1988.

Facilities and aircraft 
It has one runway designated 15/33 with an asphalt surface measuring 3,900 by 75 feet (1,189 x 23 m).

For the 12-month period ending August 31, 2005, the airport had 13,300 aircraft operations, an average of 36 per day: 98% general aviation and 2% military. At that time there were 34 aircraft based at this airport: 85% single-engine, 3% multi-engine, 3% helicopter and 8% ultralight.

References

External links 
 

Airports in Minnesota
Transportation in Mille Lacs County, Minnesota
Buildings and structures in Mille Lacs County, Minnesota